Iringa Region (Mkoa wa Iringa in Swahili)  is one of Tanzania's 31 administrative regions. The region is comparable in size to the combined land area of the nation state of Guinea Bissau. Iringa Region is bordered to the east by Morogoro Region and south by Njombe Region. On the west the region is bodered by Mbeya Region. Dodoma Region and Singida Region border Iringa on the north. The regional capital is the city Iringa for which the city is named after. According to the 2012 census, the region has a total population of 941,238. Iringa Region is home to Ruaha National Park, Tanzania's second national largest park.

Geography
The elevation of Iringa varies from 900 to 2,300 meters above sea level. A significant scarp that can reach 800 meters in height and is the eastern portion of the Great Rift Valley surrounds the area on all sides. Iringa is hence situated in Tanzania's southern highlands, bordering the Mbeya, Njombe, Morogoro, Dodoma, and Singida areas.

The region is drained by the Little Ruaha and the Great Ruaha rivers. The lake created by the Mtera Dam is the other significant water body here.

The region can be divided into three zones - highland, midland and lowland. The highland zone is towards the east of the region. The period between June and September is cold and dry.

About 16% of the land in Iringa Region is forested. The region is host to the Ruaha National Park, famous for its large herd of elephants and over 400 species of birds. Other animals include lions, sable antelopes and kudu. A second park, Udzungwa Mountains National Park in Iringa Rural District, is less visited.

Demographics

Iringa Region has a total population of 941,238.

Hehe people are the largest ethnic group living in the region. Other major populations are those of Bena and Kinga groups. Pangwa, Chaga, Nyakyusa and Ngoni can be found in urban areas primarily engaged in business in the region. other immigrants into Iringa include Maasai and sukuma and groups are mostly engaged in pastrolism. The region has one of the lowest growing populations in Tanzania. A major reason for this is persistent emigration from this region to more urban areas such as Dar es Salaam.

Administrative divisions

Districts
Iringa Region is divided into three districts (Iringa, Kilolo and Mufindi), each administered by a council. The districts have local authorities operating under their supervision, these are three district councils, one municipal council, and one town council as listed in the table:

Politics
Iringa Region elects seven representatives to the National Assembly of Tanzania. In the 2015 general election, six candidates from the ruling Chama Cha Mapinduzi and one from CHADEMA won their respective seats. William Lukuvi, the MP for Ismani is the Cabinet Minister for Lands, Housing and Human Settlements Development. Njombe Region was split off from Iringa in March 2012.

Economy
Iringa Region has the fifth largest GDP out of the 30 regions in Tanzania. On a per-capita basis, Iringa's 2012 figure of about TSh 1,400,000  ranks it second only to Dar es Salaam Region which includes the capital of Tanzania.

Agriculture is the mainstay of Iringa's economy accounting for 85% of its GDP. Between 2008 and 2011, an average  of land was planted with food crops annually. Cash crops take about 56,000.00 hectares with sunflower being the major output.

The industry in Iringa Region is mostly small scaled and largely located in the Iringa municipality.The food industry consists of tomatoes and chili processing, milk processing, grain milling. There is also carpentry and oil processing which comprise the bulk of industrial units found within the Iringa Region.

References

External links

 

 
Regions of Tanzania